Jacquelin Perske is an Australian screenwriter and producer who is best known as co-creator of the television series, Love My Way and for her screenplay for The Cry.

Television adaptations 
She wrote four of the six episodes of the 2017 drama series, Seven Types of Ambiguity, adapted from Elliot Perlman's 2003 book of the same name, and was executive producer alongside Tony Ayres.

Perske adapted Helen FitzGerald's novel, The Cry, into the four-part 2018 television series of the same name, produced for the ABC and BBC.

Awards 
Perske won the Film Script category at the 2005 Queensland Premier's Literary Awards with her screenplay for Little Fish.

She was awarded the Best Screenplay in Television prize for episode 2 of Seven Types of Ambiguity at the 7th AACTA Awards.

She was joint winner of the Script category at the 2020 New South Wales Premier's Literary Awards for Episode 2 of The Cry.

Filmography

Television

Film

References

External links 

 

Living people
Year of birth missing (living people)
Australian screenwriters
Australian television producers
Australian women screenwriters
Australian television writers
Australian women television writers